Heterotheca stenophylla, called the stiffleaf goldenaster, is a North American species of flowering plant in the family Asteraceae. It grows on the Great Plains of the central United States from South Dakota south to Texas and New Mexico.

Varieties
Heterotheca stenophylla var. angustifolia (Rydb.) Semple 
Heterotheca stenophylla var. stenophylla

References

stenophylla
Flora of the Great Plains (North America)
Plants described in 1850